Christiane Kammermann (born 10 July 1932 in Boulogne-Billancourt) is a French politician and a member of the Senate of France. She is a member of the Union for a Popular Movement Party.

References
Page on the Senate website

1932 births
Living people
People from Boulogne-Billancourt
Union for a Popular Movement politicians
Gaullism, a way forward for France
French Senators of the Fifth Republic
Women members of the Senate (France)
21st-century French women politicians
Senators of French citizens living abroad
Officiers of the Légion d'honneur
Officers of the Ordre national du Mérite
20th-century French women